Yunus Sarı (born January 21, 1991) is a Turkish taekwondo practitioner competing in the welterweight division. He is a member of Ulaştırmaspor, a club of the Ministry of Transport.Athlete is student of physical education and sports at Selçuk University in Konya. His two brothers Ali and Talha are also successful taekwondo practitioners.

He won the silver medal in the welterweight division at the 2011 World Taekwondo Championships held in Gyeongju, South Korea. At the 2013 Mediterranean Games held in Mersin, Turkey, he won the bronze medal in the 80 kg event.

Medals records
 2005 European Cadets Taekwondo Championships in Palermo, Italy - 
 2007 Black Sea Games in Trabzon, Turkey - 1
 2007 European Junior Taekwondo Championships in Baku, Azerbaijan - 
 2010 World University Taekwondo Championships  in Vigo, Spain - 
 2010 World Taekwondo Championships for Teams in Urumqi, China - 
 2011 Summer Universiade in Shenzhen, China - 2
2011 World Taekwondo Championships in Gyeongju, South Korea. -
 2012 World University Taekwondo Championships  in Poncheon, South Korea - 
 2013 European Clubs Taekwondo Championships in Athens, Greece. -
 2016 European Taekwondo Championships in Montreux, Switzerland -

References

1991 births
People from Beyşehir
Turkish male taekwondo practitioners
Living people
Selçuk University alumni
European Games competitors for Turkey
Taekwondo practitioners at the 2015 European Games
Mediterranean Games bronze medalists for Turkey
Competitors at the 2013 Mediterranean Games
Universiade medalists in taekwondo
Competitors at the 2018 Mediterranean Games
Mediterranean Games medalists in taekwondo
Universiade silver medalists for Turkey
European Taekwondo Championships medalists
World Taekwondo Championships medalists
Medalists at the 2011 Summer Universiade
21st-century Turkish people